Side Impact Protection System (SIPS) is a passive safety system in an automobile to protect against injury in a side collision, developed by Volvo Cars.

History
SIPS was first introduced in 1991 for the Volvo 700, 900 and 850 series cars of model year 1992. It has been standard on every new Volvo since.

SIPS consists of a reinforced lower sill panel, "B pillar" and reinforcements with energy absorbing honeycomb materials inside the doors. The idea is to more widely distribute the energy in a side collision across the whole side of the car rather than having the b-pillar absorb it all. Driver and passenger seat are mounted on transverse steel rails, not bolted to the floor as per the standard configuration. In a side impact these transverse rails allow the seats to crush a reinforced center console designed to absorb additional energy.

In 1994, for the 1995 model year, the SIPS-Bag was introduced. Initially an option on 850 models, it became standard equipment of all new Volvo automobiles beginning in 1995 for the 1996 model year. The system consists of a mechanically activated side airbag that protects the front seat occupants torsos from hitting the cars interior.

In 1998, for the 1999 model year, the system was extensively redesigned. With the launch of the Volvo S80 the IC airbag, a curtain style airbag deploying from the headlining to protect the head, was added. It has since been standard equipment on all newly released Volvos.
Because of technical reasons the existing Volvo S70, V70 and C70 models were instead equipped with the SIPS-BAG II.

In 2006, for the 2007 model year, the fourth generation SIPS was introduced. More high strength steel, structural changes, more bracing and with dual chamber sips-bag.

See also
WHIPS (Whiplash Protection System)

References

Vehicle safety technologies
Volvo Cars